The Germany women's national wheelchair basketball team represents Germany in international women's wheelchair basketball competitions.

The team won the gold medal in the women's tournament at the 2012 Summer Paralympics held in London, United Kingdom The team won the silver medal in the women's tournament at the 2016 Summer Paralympics held in Rio de Janeiro, Brazil.

The team finished in 4th place in the women's tournament at the 2020 Summer Paralympics held in Tokyo, Japan.

References

National women's wheelchair basketball teams
Wheelchair basketball in Germany
Women's basketball teams in Germany